Joseph-Victor-Aimé Langlois (6 December 1880 – 24 March 1954) was a Canadian lawyer and politician. Langlois was a Liberal party member of the House of Commons of Canada.

Langlois was born in Varennes, Quebec. From 1904, Langlois served as secretary-treasurer of Varennes. From 1918 to 1925, he managed his community's branch of the Provincial Bank of Canada. He married Regina Massue, a granddaughter of House of Commons member Louis Huet Massue of the Richelieu riding.

He was first elected to Parliament at the Chambly—Verchères riding in the 1925 general election and re-elected there in 1926. After completing his second term, the 16th Canadian Parliament, Langlois left federal politics and did not seek re-election in the 1930 vote.

References

External links
 

1880 births
1954 deaths
Liberal Party of Canada MPs
Members of the House of Commons of Canada from Quebec
People from Varennes, Quebec